Bellis sylvestris, the southern daisy, is a species of the genus Bellis. It is a perennial plant native to central and southern Europe, the Middle East, and north Africa, and grows up to fifteen centimetres (six inches) tall.
The name sylvestris comes from the word silvestris meaning "living in the woods" in Latin.

Characteristics
The southern daisy's creeping roots are rhizomes. The plant's flower is composed of tens or hundreds of minuscule flowers known as an inflorescence. The plant bears fruits called achenes.

References

sylvestris
Flora of Malta